Gustavo Rojo Pinto (5 September 1923 – 22 April 2017) was a Uruguayan-Mexican actor.

Life and career
Gustavo Rojo was born on 5 September 1923 on a German ship in the middle of the Atlantic Ocean. His mother was the prominent Spanish author Mercedes Pinto, who emigrated to Uruguay for political reasons. His two older siblings, Pituka de Foronda and Ruben Rojo, also became actors. In the late 1920s, Mercedes wrote a play and Gustavo made his theater debut. Gustavo's screen debut came as a child actor in the 1938 Cuban film Ahora seremos felices, in which his older sister Pituka had a starring role. In the 1940s, the family moved to Mexico, where Rojo worked steadily throughout the 1940s.

In 1947, he made his Hollywood debut in the film Tarzan and the Mermaids, which starred Johnny Weissmuller and Brenda Joyce.

Rojo was engaged to Austrian actress Erika Remberg in 1958. He died on 22 April 2017 at the age of 93.

Selected filmography

Film

Ahora seremos felices (1938) as Radio Station boy #1 (uncredited)
Mis hijos (1944) as Luis
Murallas de pasión (1944)
Amok (1944)
Una canción en la noche (1945)
Corazones de México (1945)
Mamá Inés (1946)
Las colegialas (1946) as Gabriel Solórzano
El último amor de Goya (1946)
A Insaciável (1947) as Mario
Todo un caballero (1947) as Carlos Alcalde
Tarzan and the Mermaids (1948) as Tiko
Courtesan (1948)
Barrio de pasiones (1948)
Una mujer con pasado (1949) as Federico de Medina
Cuando los padres se quedan solos (1949) as Fernando
Eterna agonía (1949) as Humberto
Cuando baja la marea (1949)
Café de chinos (1949) as Enrique
The Great Madcap (1949) as Eduardo de la Mata
La virgen desnuda (1950)
Un grito en la noche (1950)
El sol sale para todos (1950)
Te besaré en la boca (1950)
Yo quiero ser tonta (1950) as Juan
La reina del mambo (1951) as Luis
El grito de la carne (1951) as Roberto
Doña Clarines (1951) as Miguel Castañeda / Luis
Red Fury (1951) as Ramón Stevens
Stronghold (1951)
Cerca del cielo (1951)
The Evil Forest (1951) as Parsifal
From Madrid to Heaven (1952) as Pablo Iriarte
Younger Brother (1953)
Los que no deben nacer (1953)
Under the Sky of Spain (1953)
Borrasca en las almas (1954) as Rogelio del Moral
La sobrina del señor cura (1954) as Bernabé
Tehuantepec (1954)
The Island Princess (1954) as Bentejui
Angels of the Street (1954)
La lupa (1955) as Carlos Iriarte
La mujer ajena (1955)
Alexander the Great (1956) as Cleitus the Black
Engaged to Death (1957) as Pietro
Action of the Tiger (1957) as Henri Malvoisie
La guerra empieza en Cuba (1957) as Capitán Javier Romero
Desnúdate, Lucrecia (1958) as Nicolás de la Fuente
Secretaria peligrosa (1958)
Il romanzo di un giovane povero (1958) as Massimo
La tirana (1958) as Vizconde de Acarí / Conde de San Esteban del Río
Parque de Madrid (1959)
It Started with a Kiss (1959) as Antonio Soriano
María de la O (1959) as Don Luís Suárez
S.O.S., abuelita (1959)
The Miracle (1959) as Cordoba
Juicio final (1960)
Schön ist die Liebe am Königssee (1961) as Ronald Twiss
La grande vallata (1961)
El amor empieza en sábado (1961) as Mr. White
 (1961) as Ferdinand Sander
Julius Caesar Against the Pirates (1962) as Julius Caesar
 (1962) as Furio
Murder in Rio (1963) as Dumont
The Secret of Dr. Mabuse (1964) as Mario Monta
Der Chef wünscht keine Zeugen (1964) as Armand de Guedez
Old Shatterhand (1964) as Corporal Bush
The Treasure of the Aztecs (1965) as Teniente Potoca
Genghis Khan (1965) as Altan
The Pyramid of the Sun God (1965) as Teniente Potoca
Wild Kurdistan (1965) as Ahmed El Corda
El marqués (1965) as Director of the Casino
Kingdom of the Silver Lion (1965) as Ahmed El Corda
Come to the Blue Adriatic (1966) as Sr. Hernandez
Europa canta (1966) as Chief Big Vulture
Seven Vengeful Women (1966) as Gus Macintosh
Django Does Not Forgive (1966)
Kitosh: The Man Who Came From The North (1967) as José
A Witch Without a Broom (1967) as Caius
The Fickle Finger of Fate (1967) as Estrala
The Christmas Kid (1967) as Mayor Louis Carillo
Spy Today, Die Tomorrow (1967) as Peppino
The Vengeance of Pancho Villa (1967) as General Urbina
Ragan (1968) as Velludo
Madigan's Millions (1968) as Lt. Arco
Battle of the Last Panzer (1969)
The Valley of Gwangi (1969) as Carlos dos Orsos
A Bullet for Sandoval (1969) as Guadalupano
El niño y el potro (Más allá de río Miño) (1969) as Andrés
Land Raiders (1970) as Juantez
El Condor (1970) as Colonel Anguinaldo
El último día de la guerra (1970) as Pvt. Hawk
El hombre que vino del odio (1971)
Natacha (1971) as Raúl
Gracia y el forastero (1974)
Hermanos de sangre (1974)
Divorcio a la andaluza (1975)
El compadre más padre (1976)
El látigo (1978)
Cuando tejen las arañas (1979) as Padre de Laura
Reventon en Acapulco (1982)
La golfa del barrio (1982)
Corrupción (1984) as Dr. Antonio Arenas
De puro relajo (1986)
Solicito marido para engañar (1988) as Ángel
Sabor a mí (1988)
Venganza juvenil (1988)
El cornudo soy yo (1989)
Fuera de la ley (1998)

Telenovelas

No creo en los hombres (1969) as Roberto
Natacha (1970-1971) (Perú) as Raúl Pereyra
El amor tiene cara de mujer (1971) as Cristián
¿Quién? (1973)
Muñeca (1974) as Padre Félix
Mundo de juguete (1974-1977) as Carlos
La tierra (1974-1975)
Marcha nupcial (1977) as Esteban
Una mujer (1978) as Manuel
La divina Sarah (1980) as Richepin
Lágrimas de amor (1980) as Germán
Secreto de confesión (1980) as Jorge
Una limosna de amor (1981) as Rolando
Mañana es primavera (1982) as Alfredo Serrano
Sí, mi amor (1984) as Sr. Edward Williams
Pobre señorita Limantour (1987)
Rosa salvaje (1987-1988) as Padre Manuel de la Huerta
María Mercedes (1992-1993) as Dr. Pérez
Si Dios me quita la vida (1995) as Don Jesús Sánchez Amaro
Confidente de secundaria (1996) as Miramontes
Mi querida Isabel (1996-1997) as Joaquín
Esmeralda (1997) as Bernardo Pérez-Montalvo
Sin ti (1997-1998) as Don Nicolás Rubio-Castillo
Salud, dinero y amor (1997) as Federico Montiel
Soñadoras (1998-1999) as Don Alfredo Guzmán
Alma rebelde (1999) as Octavio Fuentes Cano
Cuento de Navidad (1999) as Mariano 
Carita de ángel (2000-2001) as Padre Cosme
Por un beso (2000) as Lic. Carlos Guillén
La intrusa (2001) as Víctor Rivadeneyra
Cómplices al rescate (2002) as Dr. Federico Rueda
Apuesta por un amor (2004-2005) as Lic. Leonardo de la Rosa
Destilando amor (2007) as Néstor Videgaray
Al diablo con los guapos (2007-2008) as Ernesto Robledo
Mañana es para siempre (2008-2009) as Obispo
Corazón salvaje (2009-2010) as Alberto Villarreal
Triunfo del amor (2010-2011) as Padre Jerónimo
Abismo de pasión (2012) as Obispo
Qué pobres tan ricos (2013-2014) as Aureliano Ruizpalacios
Un camino hacia el destino (2016) as Don Fernando

Television series
Straightaway, episode "The Racer and the Lady" as Salamanca (1961)

References

External links
 
 

1923 births
2017 deaths
Uruguayan male film actors
Male actors from Montevideo
Male Spaghetti Western actors
20th-century Uruguayan male actors
Uruguayan expatriates in Spain
Uruguayan expatriates in Mexico